Cui Peng may refer to:

 Cui Peng (footballer) (born 1987), Chinese football player
 Cui Peng (actor), Chinese actor
 Cui Peng (politician), discipline inspector for the Communist Party of China